The Ferme was a  56-gun Bordelois-class ship of the line of the French Navy. She was funded by a don des vaisseaux donation from the Ferme Générale, and built by engineer Léon Guignace on a design by Antoine Groignard. Complete too late to serve in the Seven Years' War, she was sold to the Ottoman Empire and recommissioned in the Ottoman Navy.

Notes and references

Notes

References 

Ships of the line of the French Navy
1763 ships
Don des vaisseaux
Bordelois-class ships of the line
Ships of the line of the Ottoman Navy